was a Japanese voice actor who worked for 81 Produce. He died on February 8, 2022, at the age of 88.

Filmography

Television animation
Jungle Emperor (1965) (Lion A)
Sabu to Ichi Torimono Hikae (1968) (Rihei)
Andersen Stories (1971) (Ole the Dream-god)
Science Ninja Team Gatchaman (1972) (Old man)
The Adventures of Pepero (1975) (Titicaca)
3000 Leagues in Search of Mother (1976) (Lombardini)
Rascal the Raccoon (1977) (Futon)
Lupin III Part 2 (1977) (Commissioner, Part 2 Episode 155)
The Story of Perrine (1978) (Onu)
Mobile Suit Zeta Gundam (1985) (Melanie Hue Carbine)
Princess Sarah (1985) (Monsieur Dufarge)
Parasol Henbē (1989) (Principal)
Pretty Soldier Sailor Moon (1992) (Kunitachi)
Bonobono (1995) (Ōsanshōuo-san and Kaeru-kun)
Pocket Monsters (1998) (Katsura)
Ojarumaru (1998) (Tomio Tamura)
Mirmo! (2003) (Enma-sensei)
One Piece (2011) (Nefertari Cobra)

Original video animation (OVA)
Legend of the Galactic Heroes (1994) (Otto Wehler)
The Silent Service (1995) (Nicholas J. Bennett)
Burn-Up W (1996) (Professor M)

Theatrical animation
Doraemon: Nobita's Great Adventure into the Underworld (1984) (Medusa)
Mobile Suit Zeta Gundam: A New Translation II - Lovers (2005) (Melanie Hue Carbine)
Mobile Suit Zeta Gundam: A New Translation III - Love is the Pulse of the Stars (2006) (Melanie Hue Carbine)

Video games
Kingdom Hearts II (2005) (Owl)

Dubbing roles

Live-action
Back to the Future (1989 TV Asahi edition) (Lou (Norman Alden))
Battle of Britain (Baron von Richter (Curd Jürgens))
The Big Brawl (Kwan (Chao-Li Chi))
The China Syndrome (1985 NTV edition) (Evan McCormack (Richard Herd))
Christopher Robin (Owl)
Damien: Omen II (1981 TBS edition) (Bill Atherton (Lew Ayres))
Dead Poets Society (Headmaster Gale Nolan (Norman Lloyd))
Dirty Harry (1978 TV Asahi edition) (Sid Kleinman (Maurice Argent))
Dune (Gurney Halleck (Patrick Stewart))
Emperor of the North Pole (Cracker (Charles Tyner))
Existenz (Gas (Willem Dafoe))
Fire Down Below (2000 TV Asahi edition) (Cotton Harry (Harry Dean Stanton))
The Great Escape (1971 Fuji TV edition) (Flt. Lt. MacDonald (Gordon Jackson))
The Horse Soldiers (1983 TBS edition) (Col. Phil Secord (Willis Bouchey))
Lorenzo's Oil (Doctor Judalon (Gerry Bamman))
The Mask (1996 NTV edition) (Dr. Arthur Neuman (Ben Stein))
Nell (Dr. Alexander "Al" Paley (Richard Libertini))
The NeverEnding Story (Engywook (Sydney Bromley))
Night on Earth (Helmut Grokenberger (Armin Mueller-Stahl))
Nineteen Eighty-Four (Emmanuel Goldstein (John Boswall))
North (Judge Buckle (Alan Arkin))
The Peacemaker (Colonel Dimitri Vertikoff (Armin Mueller-Stahl))
The Pirate Movie (Major-General Stanley (Bill Kerr))
Schindler's List (Itzhak Stern (Ben Kingsley))
Seven (1998 Fuji TV edition) (Mark Swarr (Richard Schiff))
She-Wolf of London (Angus (Charles Lewsen))
The Sting (Eddie Niles (John Heffernan))
Striking Distance (Captain Vince Hardy (John Mahoney))
Two Much (Sheldon Dodge (Eli Wallach))
Wall Street (1992 TV Asahi edition) (Cromwell (Richard Dysart))
Warlords of Atlantis (1981 TV Asahi edition) (Jacko (Derry Power))
The Wild Geese (Sergeant Jock McTaggart (Ronald Fraser))

Animation
Biker Mice from Mars (Dr. Benjamin Boris Zachary Karbunkle)
Mune: Guardian of the Moon (Yule)
Sonic the Hedgehog (Uncle Chuck Hedgehog)
Winnie-the-Pooh series (Owl)

Tokusatsu
Choushinsei Flashman (1986) - Hero Titan (2 episodes)
Choushinsei Flashman: Big Rally! Titan Boy! (1986) - Hero Titan
Hikari Sentai Maskman (1988) - Water Mirror (ep. 50)
Gekisou Sentai Carranger (1996) - OO Oopa (ep. 18)

References

External links
 
 81 Produce entry
 Toshiya Ueda at GamePlaza-Haruka Voice Acting Database 
 Toshiya Ueda at Hitoshi Doi's Seiyuu Database

1933 births
2022 deaths
81 Produce voice actors
Male voice actors from Sapporo
Japanese male voice actors
Waseda University alumni
People from Sapporo